Mutiny in the Big House is a 1939 American film directed by William Nigh.

Plot 
Father Joe Collins is a kindly but realistic prison chaplain who tries to bring some humanity behind the grim walls of a major penitentiary. One of his success stories is "Dad" Schultz, a kindly convict who was released after 20 years but found the outside world so overwhelming that he had a nervous breakdown. Father Collins convinces the prison officials to take him back as a civilian employee/gardener, so he will "feel at home".

Father Collins also takes an interest in Johnny Davis, an educated inmate who received an overly stiff sentence for
forging a $10.00 check. Hardened lifer Red Manson does his best to lessen the influence of Father Collins among the inmates, while planning a mass breakout.

When the break begins, Davis wildly fires a rifle to keep Father Collins from being taken hostage. The distraction
enables the guards to regain control of the prison.

His actions gain Davis an early release, meanwhile Manson, who killed two guards during the riot, is headed for death row.

Cast 
Charles Bickford as Father Joe Collins
Barton MacLane as Red Manson
Pat Moriarity as Pat, the Warden
Dennis Moore as Johnny Davis
William Royle as Captain of Guards Ed Samson
Charley Foy as Convict Bitsy
George Cleveland as Convict "Dad" Schultz
Nigel De Brulier as Convict Mike Faleri
Eddie Foster as Convict Del
Richard Austin as Singing Jim
Russell Hopton as Convict Frankie

External links 

1939 films
1939 drama films
1930s prison films
American black-and-white films
American prison drama films
Films directed by William Nigh
Monogram Pictures films
1930s English-language films
1930s American films